Proops is a surname. Notable people with the surname include:

Greg Proops (born 1959), American actor, stand-up comedian, and television host
Marjorie Proops (1911–1996), British advice columnist